The 2019 Loudoun United FC season is Loudoun United FC's first season of existence, their first in the second-division of American soccer, and their 1st in the USL Championship. It is the first season since 2011 D.C. United will be fielding a reserve team.

Background 
On July 18, 2018, the club was announced by USL and D.C. United as were the team's name, colors and crest. Loudoun United replaced Richmond Kickers as D.C.'s USL affiliate.

Review

Early season 
On March 9, 2019, Loudoun United played their first USL Championship game, losing 0–2 against Nashville SC. The next week, Loudoun had their first goal in club history, when Griffin Yow scored in the 30th minute against Memphis 901 FC in a game that ended in a 1–1 draw. On April 3, it was announced that Loudoun would play in Audi Field for three "home away from home" games. Loudoun United won their first game in history when they beat New York Red Bulls II 3–1 on April 20, 2019.  On May 3, Loudoun played their first "home away from home" game at Audi Field against Bethlehem Steel. The game ended in a 3–3 draw. On May 30, the current Head Coach, Richie Williams was hired by MLS side, New England Revolution for the role of assistant coach. Williams was then replaced by former academy director, Ryan Martin.

Midseason 
On August 9, Loudoun played their first game in their newly-constructed Segra Field against Charlotte Independence. The game ended in a 3–3 draw in front of 5,015 spectators. Loudoun won their first game at Segra Field on August 31, in a 4–0 against North Carolina FC.

Late season 
Loudoun won all of their 4 last regular season games. In their final regular season game, they played against the New York Red Bulls II at home, and won 7–3 in front of a crowd of 3,014 people. They finished their inaugural season in 12th place in the eastern conference and were just 4 points behind the playoffs line.

Club

Roster

Staff

Competitions

Exhibitions

USL Championship

Standings

Matches 
On December 19, 2018, the USL announced their 2019 season schedule.
All times are in Eastern time.

U.S. Open Cup 

Due to their ownership by a more advanced level professional club, LUFC is one of 13 teams expressly forbidden from entering the Cup competition.

Transfers

In

Out

See also 
 2019 USL Championship season

References 

Loudoun United FC seasons
Loudoun United FC
Loudoun United FC
Loudoun United